The Castle may refer to:

Arts and entertainment

Films 
 The Castle (1964 film), a Danish family film
 The Castle (1968 film), a West German film adaptation of Kafka's novel
 The Castle (1994 film), a Russian film adaptation of Kafka's novel
 The Castle (1997 Australian  film), a comedy-drama film
 The Castle (1997 Austrian film), an adaptation of Kafka's novel

Other uses in arts and entertainment 
 The Castle (novel) (Das Schloß),  a 1926 novel by Franz Kafka
 The Castle, alternate title of Kështjella, The Siege, a 1970 Albanian novel by Ismail Kadare
 The Castle (board game), 1981
 The Castle (video game), 1986
 The Castle (radio series), a British radio comedy 2007–2012
 "The Castle", a song on the 1966 album Da Capo by Love
 "The Castle", a song on the 2017 album Oczy Mlody by The Flaming Lips
 The Castle: Aik Umeed, a 2015 Pakistani television drama series
 Castle Recording Laboratory, colloquially known as "the Castle", a defunct recording studio in Nashville, Tennessee

Places

Populated places
 The Castle, Barbados

Geographic features
 The Castle (volcano), British Columbia, Canada
 The Castle, a mountain peak in Budawang Range, New South Wales, Australia
 The Castle (Capitol Reef National Park), a summit in Capitol Reef National Park, Utah, United States
 The Castle (Washington), a summit in Mount Rainier National Park, Washington, United States

Buildings
 The Castle (Atlanta), an American historic building 
 The Castle (Waltham, Massachusetts), an American historic building 
 The Castle (Marietta, Ohio), an American historic building 
 The Castle (Saint Helena), the government buildings in Jamestown
 The Castle, Castle Eden, a mansion house in County Durham, England
 The Castle, Farringdon, a public house London, England
 The Castle, Harrow, a public house in London, England
 The Castle, Macclesfield, a public house in Cheshire, England
 The Castle, Newcastle, a medieval fortification in Newcastle upon Tyne, England 
 The Castle, formerly Windsor Park Mall, San Antonio, Texas, U.S.
 The Castle, nickname of the Smithsonian Institution Building, Washington D.C., U.S.
 Castle of Good Hope, known as "the Castle", a fort in Cape Town, South Africa, 
 David Hyatt Van Dolah House, also known as The Castle, in Lexington, Illinois, U.S.

Other uses
The Castle School, a coeducational secondary school in Thornbury, Gloucestershire, England
The Castle School, Taunton, a co-educational secondary school in Taunton, Somerset, England

See also 
 

 Castle (disambiguation)
 Borgen (disambiguation)
 El Castillo (disambiguation)